Phleomycins are a group of glycopeptide antibiotics found in Streptomyces which are closely related to bleomycin.

Examples include:
 Phleomycin C
 Phleomycin D1 (zeocin)
 Phleomycin D2
 Phleomycin E

References

Glycopeptide antibiotics
Eukaryotic selection compounds